Appassionata is an album by Ramsey Lewis, released in 1999 on Narada Records. The album peaked at No. 23 on the Billboard Top Jazz Albums chart.

Overview
Appassionata was produced by Ramsey Lewis.

Critical reception

Jonathan Widran of AllMusic noted that "Lewis brings the titular passion to tunes inspired by or taken from opera, classical, jazz, and gospel". Hilarie Grey of JazzTimes declared that "Lewis puts on a clinic of exploratory, dynamic improvisation with Appassionata".

Track listing

References

1999 albums
Ramsey Lewis albums
Narada Productions albums